This is a list of films which placed number one at the weekend box office for the year 2023.

Number-one films

References

See also
 Cinema of Austria

Austria
2023